Trosia roseipuncta is a moth of the Megalopygidae family. It was described by Druce in 1906.

References

Moths described in 1906
Megalopygidae